The Jewish Cause: An Introduction to a Different Israeli History is the second book by Moshe Berent. The Hebrew book was published in 2019 in Jerusalem in a series of books "Interpretation and Culture" in Carmel Publishing House, edited by Prof. Avi Sagi. The book expands on the themes of Berent's earlier book "A people like all the peoples - towards the establishment of an Israeli republic" in an attempt to answer the questions regarding the Labor leadership of the Zionist movement:

 To what extent did it aspire to a Jewish state?
 Was it interested in the mass immigration of European Jews to the Land of Israel between the two world wars?
 To what extent did it act to rescue Jews during the Holocaust?

The book goes against some accepted assumptions in Zionist historiography and in the Israeli public. The Zionist movement was founded by Theodor Herzl as a movement for the "Jewish cause," that is, the solution of the Jewish Question in Europe through the mass migration of Jews to a Jewish nation-state. With the death of Herzl and after the Uganda Scheme crisis, there was a change in the Zionist leadership's perception of the movement's goals. It was no longer perceived as responsible for the "Jewish cause", but as a project for the slow construction of the Land of Israel as a "spiritual center" or as an "exemplary society", designed to be populated, at least in the foreseeable future, with a limited Jewish elite, while most of the Jewish people stay in the diaspora, with all the implications.

Thus, the fact that on the eve of World War II there was no Jewish state, as well as the fact that the Yishuv numbered only 450,000 people, were not only as a result of British and Arab opposition, but mainly of the policy of the Zionist movement, which dragged its feet regarding the establishment of a state, and opposed mass Jewish immigration for fear that it would harm the "exemplary society" it wanted to create in the country.

Since the Zionist movement did not consider itself responsible for the "Jewish cause", it also did not consider itself responsible for the fate of European Jewry.  It did not act forcefully and decisively to save Jews in the Holocaust, thus missing many opportunities - which had tragic consequences.

External links
 About the book, on the website Magnes Publishing (in Hebrew)
  A seminar at the Open University on the occasion of the publication of the book, 26 November 2019 (in Hebrew)
 The podcast of "Big History, Small Details" hosts Berent in a discussion of the Zionist project, the Jewish presence in the Middle East, the Holocaust and the connection between them, episode 84, uploaded on December 25, 2019: Apple, Soundcloud, Podtail (in Hebrew)
 About the book, in Segula Magazine for Jewish History, published on March 16, 2020 (in Hebrew)
 Critique of the book by Dr. Eyal Levin in "National Resilience, Politics and Society" Magazine, Issue 2 / No. 1 / Spring 2020, published by Ariel University (in Hebrew)
 The Jewish cause: an introduction to a different Israeli history, at the OCLC website (in English)

Footnotes 

Political history of Israel
The Holocaust
Zionism